Clifford Whitehead was a male athlete who competed for England.

Athletics career
He competed for England in the 880 yards at the 1934 British Empire Games in London.

He represented the Salford Harriers  and was the 1933 AAA Champion.

References

1909 births
English male middle-distance runners
Athletes (track and field) at the 1934 British Empire Games
Year of death missing
Commonwealth Games competitors for England